The Ernst-Neufert-Haus (sometimes also known as the Meisterbau) is a massive, brown clinker-clad residential building in Darmstadt, Hesse, designed by Ernst Neufert. It was built in 1955 as the "Ledigenwohnheim" (single men's hostel) and was part of the 'Meisterbau' (Master Builder's) programme to give Darmstadt, which had lost much of its historical substance in World War II to bombing, a new architectural emphasis. 

While the attempt to guide the newly burgeoning city into a stylistic direction failed, and the small rooms of Neufert's building were later redesigned to more typical apartments, the building is considered a prime example of his style, and is now heritage protected. A restaurant occupies part of the lower floor, reached via a large freestanding staircase on the western side.

References 
 

Buildings and structures in Darmstadt
Apartment buildings in Germany